Omar S. Knedlik (December 21, 1916 – March 14, 1989) was an American inventor and businessman. He was best known as the inventor of the ICEE frozen drink. He was born and raised a poor farm boy in Barnes, Kansas in 1916. Knedlik was a World War II veteran who bought his first ice cream shop after the war. He owned several hotels before moving to Coffeyville, Kansas, where he became the owner of a Dairy Queen in the late-1950s. It was at this Dairy Queen that he developed the Icee machine. Knedlik did not have a soda fountain, so he served semi-frozen bottled soft drinks. He found that they were immensely popular, so he worked with a Dallas company to develop the ICEE machine. It took him five years to replicate the consistency in slushy soft drinks. In the mid-1960s, the first ICEE machines were sold in the United States.

In 1966, 7-Eleven bought some of the machines, calling its version the Slurpee. Knedlik received royalties for about 17 years until his patent expired. He moved his family from Coffeyville to Joplin, Missouri in 1983, when Knedlik developed kidney problems and needed dialysis. He died at age 73 in 1989.

References
July 2005 Daily Oklahoman history of the slurpee.  and 

1916 births
1989 deaths
American drink industry businesspeople
American military personnel of World War II
Businesspeople from Kansas
People from Coffeyville, Kansas
People from Joplin, Missouri
People from Washington County, Kansas
20th-century American businesspeople
20th-century American engineers
20th-century American inventors
Inventors from Kansas